Lise Thériault (born January 7, 1966) is a former Canadian politician. She is a former Member of the National Assembly of Quebec representing the riding of Anjou–Louis-Riel in Montreal. She was the Deputy Premier of Quebec and Minister for the Status of Women in the Couillard government.

Before entering politics, Thériault was for eight years a sales director and was also for nine years an editor and co-founder of l'Édition – Le Journal des Gens d'affaires. She was an administration member of the Chamber of Commerce of Eastern Montreal, the CDEC Anjou/Montreal (a development organization) and the Collège Marie-Victorin. She was also a co-founder of a long-term care facility in Montreal.

She was elected in Anjou in a by-election in 2002 and re-elected in 2003. She was named the Minister of Immigration and Cultural Communities from 2005 to 2007 and was re-elected in the 2007 elections. Jean Charest did not reappoint her to cabinet in 2007, and Yolande James succeeded her to become the first ever Black cabinet minister in Quebec.

After the 2008 elections, she was named the delegate Minister for Social Services until 2010 where she replaced Sam Hamad as Minister of Labor.

Following the 2014 election, she was named Deputy Premier of Quebec and the first woman to become Minister of Public Security in the history of Quebec.

In 2016, she was reassigned to the Status of Women portfolio but remained deputy premier until 2017.

She decided not to seek re-election for the 2022 Quebec Provincial election.

Electoral record

|}

|}

^ Change is from redistributed results. CAQ change is from ADQ.

References

External links
 

1966 births
Living people
Deputy premiers of Quebec
Franco-Ontarian people
Members of the Executive Council of Quebec
People from Anjou, Quebec
Politicians from Montreal
Politicians from Toronto
Quebec Liberal Party MNAs
Women government ministers of Canada
Women MNAs in Quebec
21st-century Canadian women politicians